Perie Bard is one of the Shetland Islands. It is a small islet off the east coast of the island of Mousa.

Although named 'Perie Bard' on OS Maps, the name used in Shetland is "Peerie Bard".

The name is derived from the Shetland dialect words 'Peerie', meaning small, and 'Bard', meaning steep headland. The Muckle Bard, or large steep headland, is located on neighbouring Mousa.

The Mousa Lighthouse is located on the Peerie Bard. The lighthouse was first lit in 1951 and replaced one which had previously been located on the nearby headland of Noness

See also

 List of lighthouses in Scotland
 List of Northern Lighthouse Board lighthouses

References

External links
 Northern Lighthouse Board 
 

Uninhabited islands of Shetland